Raven Villanueva (born October 7, 1979) is a Filipina actress in movies and television shows in the Philippines.

Career
Villanueva played as Cris in T.G.I.S. (Thank God It's Sabado), youth-oriented drama series aired on GMA Network from 1995 to 1997, together with Angelu de Leon, Bobby Andrews, Onemig Bondoc, Ciara Sotto, among others, and continued sequel Growing Up from 1997 to 1999.

Raven was later on repackaged as a sexy actress. She did her first sexy movie with Rica Peralejo and Mark Anthony Fernandez in Erik Matti's Dos Ekis (2001) under Viva Films. She also continued her television career via "Ikaw Lang Ang Mamahalin" under GMA Network in 2001. Her last movie appearance was in the 2002 action-drama film "Hari ng Selda: Anak ni Baby Ama 2" co-starring her with Robin Padilla and Angelika Dela Cruz.

She was member of That's Entertainment Batch 1994, Monday and Thursday Group

Personal life
She was previously married to actor and news anchor Diego Castro III on August 11, 1998 in US, wherein she has a daughter, Angelica Claire. She worked in Guam for three years as a manager in a jewelry store. Villanueva and Castro are now divorced.

She is currently married to an American minister. She just recently gave birth to a baby boy and now living in Ohio, USA. Her daughter, Angelica Claire, became a contract star of Sparkle GMA Artist Center and is now known as Claire Castro.

Filmography
Troika (2007)
At Your Service (TV show) (2005)
Lastikman (2003)
Narito ang Puso Ko (2003–2004)
Mama San (2002)
Hari Ng Selda: Anak Ni Baby Ama 2 (2002)
Ikaw Lang Ang Mamahalin (TV series) (2001)
Dos Ekis (2001)
Honey, Nasa Langit Na Ba Ako? (1998)
T.G.I.S.: The Movie (1997)
Growing Up (TV series) (1997–1999)
Where 'D Girls 'R (1996)
Are You Afraid Of The Dark? (1996)
Wanted: Perfect Mother (1996)
April Boys: Sana'y Mahalin Mo Rin Ako (1996)
TGIS (TV series) (1995–1997)

References

External links

Living people
Filipino film actresses
1976 births
Filipino television actresses
Filipino expatriates in the United States
People from Marikina
GMA Network personalities